The 1950 Arizona gubernatorial election took place on November 7, 1950. Incumbent Governor Dan Edward Garvey, who originally ascended to the office of Governor following the death of Sidney Preston Osborn and was later elected to a full term, lost the Democratic primary to state Auditor Ana Frohmiller. Frohmiller would become the first woman to be nominated by any party for governor in Arizona.

Following a shift in voters to the Republican Party in the past two election cycles, John Howard Pyle narrowly defeated Ana Frohmiller, becoming the first Republican Governor of Arizona since John Calhoun Phillips was defeated for reelection and left office in 1931.

Democratic primary
The Democratic primary took place on September 12, 1950. Incumbent Governor Dan Edward Garvey, who ascended to the office of governor (as Secretary of State of Arizona) following the death of Governor Sidney Preston Osborn, and was subsequently elected to a full term in 1948, was defeated in the Democratic primary by State Auditor Ana Frohmiller. Frohmiller had served as state auditor since being elected in 1926, and was seen as a pioneer for women. U.S. Congressman Richard F. Harless also ran again after failing to win in 1948, as well as Jim Smith, Ralph Watkins, and perennial candidate Howard Sprouse.

Candidates
 Dan Edward Garvey, incumbent governor
 Ana Frohmiller, state auditor
 Richard F. Harless, U.S. Congressman
 Jim Smith
 Ralph Watkins
 Howard Sprouse, perennial candidate

Results

Republican primary

Candidates
 John Howard Pyle, radio program director, World War II correspondent

General election
U.S. Senator and Republican Presidential candidate Barry Goldwater wrote in his memoir "With No Apologies" that Frohmiller was "an attractive lady  who had earned quite a following as a result of her long and excellent service as State Auditor." He also observed that the voters of Arizona weren't ready for a woman Governor in 1950. Frohmiller lost the election to Pyle, who became the first Republican Governor of Arizona since John Calhoun Phillips was elected in 1928, despite the fact that at the time of her nomination she seemed to be the front-runner.

Results

References

1950
1950 United States gubernatorial elections
Gubernatorial
November 1950 events in the United States